Stéphane Agbré Dasse (born 5 July 1989 in Bingerville), is a Burkinabé footballer, who plays as a left back for US Lusitanos Saint-Maur.

Career
Stéphane began his career in 2006 with F.C. Porto, who called him to the first squad in June 2008. In July of the same year, he was loaned out until the end of the season to the Liga de Honra club S.C. Olhanense. After a good season, his club S.C. Olhanense pulled the sold option and he signed a contract until 30 June 2012.

Ahead of the 2019/20 season, Dasse joined French club US Lusitanos Saint-Maur.

International career
The Ivorian-born Stéphane was called for the Burkina Faso national football team match in the 2010 FIFA World Cup qualification against Guinea on 28 March 2009.

Despite being capped by the Burkina Faso national team, as of January 2012, the Burkinabé Football Association no long believe the player to be eligible for the national squad.

References

External links
 
 
 

1989 births
Living people
People from Bingerville
Burkina Faso international footballers
Burkinabé footballers
Burkinabé expatriate footballers
Expatriate footballers in Portugal
Expatriate footballers in Georgia (country)
Expatriate footballers in France
Association football defenders
Ivorian footballers
Liga Portugal 2 players
Primeira Liga players
Erovnuli Liga players
FC Porto players
S.C. Olhanense players
Atlético Clube de Portugal players
F.C. Arouca players
C.F. União players
G.D. Chaves players
Académico de Viseu F.C. players
FC Shukura Kobuleti players
Leixões S.C. players
US Lusitanos Saint-Maur players
21st-century Burkinabé people

Ivorian expatriate sportspeople in Portugal